Comedy Premiere was a British television comedy series which aired in 1975. It was an anthology of six sitcom pilots. It was produced by Associated Television (ATV). All six episodes are believed to have been destroyed.

Episodes

References

External links

1975 British television series debuts
1975 British television series endings
Lost television shows
English-language television shows
ITV sitcoms
1970s British comedy television series
1970s British anthology television series